Senerath Somaratne (20 August 1929 - 30 March 1988) was a Sri Lankan politician. He was the Deputy Minister of Irrigation, Power and Highways and a member of Parliament of Sri Lanka from Ampara representing the Sri Lanka Freedom Party. 

Born in Palapatha in Beliatta, Senarath came to Ampara to work in the Gal Oya scheme. He was arrested during the 1958 communal riots. He was elected to parliament from Ampara in the 1965 general election, seating in the opposition and was re-elected in the 1970 general election. He was appointed Deputy Minister of Irrigation, Power and Highways in the second Bandaranaike administration. He lost his seat in the 1977 general election to P. Dayaratna.

References

1929 births
1988 deaths
Deputy ministers of Sri Lanka
Members of the 6th Parliament of Ceylon
Members of the 7th Parliament of Ceylon
Sri Lanka Freedom Party politicians